Sheila D. Wheat is an Atlanta-based singer of jazz, theater and gospel inspiration. A native of Chicago, Wheat studied music with Gloria Lewis Johnson (sister of jazz pianist Ramsey Lewis). She attended the University of Illinois-Urbana.

She toured with James Brown, and performed as a featured soloist at the National Black Arts Festival. She was a source musician for the TV movie Miss Evers' Boys.

References 

Living people
Musicians from Atlanta
21st-century African-American women singers
American women singers
American gospel singers
American soul singers
Year of birth missing (living people)